Hubert Jack Stadium is home of the Lock Haven Bald Eagles football team. The stadium serves multi-purpose events. The stadium has a capacity of 3,500. The stadium includes a two-story press box for several televised games that take place throughout each season.

External links
HavenSports Website

College football venues
Lock Haven Bald Eagles football
American football venues in Pennsylvania
Buildings and structures in Clinton County, Pennsylvania